The 1992 BC Lions finished in fourth place in the West Division with a 3–15 record and failed to make to playoffs.

Offseason

CFL Draft

Preseason

Regular season

Season standings

Season schedule

Awards and records
CFLPA's Most Outstanding Community Service Award – Danny Barrett (QB)

1992 CFL All-Stars
None

Western All-Star selections
 Jon Volpe (RB), Western All-Star
 Jim Mills (OT), Western All-Star
 Darren Flutie (WR), Western All-Star
 Lui Passaglia (K), Western All-Star

References

BC Lions seasons
BC Lions
BC Lions